Salma Malik (Urdu: سلمیٰ ملک) is a teacher at the Department of Defence and Strategic Studies, Quaid-e-Azam University in Islamabad, Pakistan.

Biography 

Salma Malik was born in Rawalpindi, Pakistan. She has studied at Islamabad College for Girls and then at FG College F-7/2, Islamabad, from where she completed her bachelor's degree. She did her master's degree and M.Phil. from Defence & Strategic Studies (DSS) Department, Quaid-i-Azam University, Islamabad.

She specializes in the areas of War, Arms Control & Disarmament, Military Sociology, South Asian Affairs and the research areas include; Conflict Management & Transformation, Human Security, CBMs & Micro-Disarmament.

Prior to joining QAU, she worked as a Research Officer at the Institute of Strategic Studies, Islamabad, Pakistan from June 1996 to August 1999. She has also been on the Visiting Faculty list of the Intelligence Bureau Directorate and has rendered lectures as a guest speaker at the PAF Air War College, Karachi, National Defence University, Islamabad, Fatima Jinnah Women University, Rawalpindi and Command and Staff College, Quetta.

She has rendered her expertise as an anchor and expert both in various current affairs programs. Ms Salma Malik has many publications to her credit and has co authored various books including “Small Arms and the Security Debate in South Asia,” RCSS Policy Studies, No. 33, Manohar Publications, New Delhi, 2005.

She is also a graduate of Asia-Pacific Center for Security Studies, Executive Level Course, Honolulu, Hawaii, USA.

She also participated in the 8th IISS Asian Security Summit, the Shangri-La Dialogue, organized by the International Institute for Strategic Studies, Singapore.

Awards (selection) 

Awarded a Fellowship under the South Asian Regional Fellowship Program by the Social Science Research Council, New York on “Revisiting Pakistan through Popular Culture: A Comparative study of India and Pakistan.” (June 2007)
Certificate in International Humanitarian Law for Working Professionals, by the International Committee of the Red Cross, Islamabad, Pakistan. (May 2006)
Awarded fellowship by the Social Science Research Council under the South Asia Research Fellowship Program, on “Pakistan: A Praetorian State or Crisis of Governance?” (2005-6
Diploma in Advance International Program in Conflict Resolution, Department of Peace and Conflict Research, Uppsala University, Sweden. (2004)
Mahbub-ul-Haque Research Award 2003 for collaborative research on non-traditional security issues, on “Introducing the Small Arms Debate in the Security Discourse of South Asia.” (2003)
Awarded University Research Fund to conduct research on “Towards a Viable Nuclear Risk Reduction Regime in South Asia,” for year 2003- 04.

Publications (selection) 

 Revisiting 1947 through Popular Cinema: A Comparative Study of India and Pakistan (2009) 
 Reviewing the Pakistan US Relations under the Obama Administration, published by Australian Institute of International Affairs Policy Commentary June 2009. Journal by the Australian Institute of International Affairs (AIIA).
Pakistan, Afghanistan & the Holbrook Visit: Reviewing the Messy Inheritance, Article No. 2816 for the Institute of Peace & Conflict Studies, Delhi, India.
Role of Research Institutes & Think Tanks in the Process of Conflict Management, book chapter in Conflict Management Mechanisms and the Challenge of Peace.
Small Arms and the Security Debate in South Asia 
Obama-nia, published in the Defence Journal, December 2008.
Darra (Arms) – A Genuine Menace or Myth, published in the Defence Journal, November 2008.
A Fresh Round of Kashmiri Intifada, published in the Defence Journal, October 2008.
The Diplomatic Jam Reviewing Pakistan’s Foreign Relations, published in the Defence Journal, September 2008.
The Proliferation Gauntlet, published in the Defence Journal, August 2008.
Think Tanks as Tools of Conflict Resolution & Management, published in the Defence Journal, July 2008.
Reforming Political Parties, Prospects & Possibilities, published in the Defence Journal, May 2008.
The Need for Security Sector Governance & Reforms in Pakistan, published in the Defence Journal, April 2008.
The Seamless Web of Terrorism & Militancy, published in the Defence Journal, March 2008.
Myth of the Loose Nukes, published in the Defence Journal, February 2008.
Pakistan: Small Arms Proliferation, book chapter in Reintroducing the Human Security Debate in South Asia, by Institute of Peace and Conflict Studies, New Delhi.
Indian Ocean - as a Zone of Future Conflict or Cooperation, published in the Defence Journal, July 2007. 
The A Q Khan Dossier: An Analysis, for Pakistan Observer, Monday May 21, 2007.
Indian Ocean - as a Zone of Future Conflict or Cooperation, for The News, Sunday March 4, 2007.
Terrorism: Implications for Pakistan’s Security, published in BIISS, Journal, Vol. 27, No. 4, October 2006, a publication of the Bangladesh International Institute for Strategic Studies, Dhaka, Bangladesh.
India - US Strategic Partnership, Implications for Regional Security, book chapter in Peace & Security in South Asia: Issues & Challenges, published by the Pakistan Studies Centre, University of the Punjab Lahore, 2006.
South Asia Peace Process: the Need to Head down a New Path, for The News Monday January 2, 2006.
Emerging Issues in Defence & Strategic Studies, A Comparative Analysis with Uppsala Peace & Conflict Research Program, book chapter in Different Perceptions on Conflict Resolution: Need for an Alternate Approach, published by the Program on Peace Studies & Conflict Resolution, Department of International Relations, Karachi University, 2005.
The Dynamics of Conflict and Conflict Resolution in South Asia, book chapter in Different Perceptions on Conflict Resolution: Need for an Alternate Approach, published by the Program on Peace Studies & Conflict Resolution, Department of International Relations, Karachi University, 2005.
Small Arms and the Security Debate in South Asia, RCSS Policy Studies, No. 33, Manohar Publications, New Delhi, 2005.
US War in Iraq in the Light of the Major and Minor Powers Conflict, published in Turkish Yearbook of International Relations, Vol. 35, 2004, Published by the Faculty of Political Science, Ankara University.
Terrorism and Its Implications on Internal & External Security Dynamics of Pakistan, Margalla Papers, Issue 2005, Journal of the National Defense University, Islamabad.
Situation Analysis of Small Arms & Light Weapons in Pakistan, paper for Peshawar-based NGO Community Appraisal & Motivation Programme (CAMP). February 2005.
Refugee Rights under International Jurisdiction: A Case Study of Afghan Refugees, in IPRI Journal, Vol. V, No.1, Winter 2005.
India- Pakistan Peace Process: The Way Forward, for The News Sunday January 1, 2005.
Major and Minor Powers Conflict in the Light of the US-Iraq War, in National Development and Security, a Foundation for Research on International Environment, National Development and Security FRIENDS Quarterly Journal, Vol. XIII, No. 1, Sr. No. 49, Autumn 2004, Islamabad.
Impact of Inter-nation Jurisdiction on Afghan Refugee Rights, Refugee Watch Issue No. 22. August 2004.
Tools of American Imperialism: Sanctions, Unilateralism & Preemptive Containment, book chapter in Unipolar World and the Muslim States, Pakistan Forum, 2004.
SAARC Summit & India - Pakistan Relations, for the Political Economy Section of The News 
12wen SAARC Conference ke Faislee Tabnaak Mustaqbal ke Bunyaad Farahim Kaar Saktee Hain, (Urdu Article) for Daily Jung Monday 19 January 2004.
Pakistan India Relations Cautious Optimism, 
The Kargil Conflict and India-Pakistan Normalization Process, in National Development and Security, a Foundation for Research on International Environment, National Development and Security FRIENDS Quarterly Journal, Vol. XII Sr. No. 45, Autumn 2003, Islamabad.
Current Scenario and Emerging Trends in Defence & Strategic Studies, Paper prepared for the conference on The State of the Social Sciences and Humanities: Current Scenario and Emerging Trends, organized by the Committee on Development of Social Science and Humanities, Higher Education Commission of Pakistan.
American Media and the War in the Balkan. A Pakistani Perspective, in Alternatives: Turkish Journal of International Relations,
9-11- An Assertion of "Clash of Civilization,

References

External links 
Dpartment of Defence and Strategic Studies

Defence Journal.

Pakistani women academics
Academic staff of Quaid-i-Azam University